The Bellefontaine Examiner is a daily newspaper published at Bellefontaine, Ohio, United States. The newspaper covers international and national, regional and local topics, with a focus on stories affecting the surrounding Logan County. During an ice storm in 2005 that affected Logan County, the Bellefontaine Examiner was not published for several days; that point was the first time the paper had not printed in 13 years. The Bellefontaine Examiner is the only daily newspaper published for Logan County.

History 
The Examiner is the latest in a series of newspapers which have been published in Bellefontaine:
Gazette, February 18, 1831-c. 1835
Bellefontaine Gazette and Logan County Advertiser, January 30, 1836–1836
Bellefontaine O. Gazette, 1836–1838
Bellefontaine Gazette, 1838–1840
Logan Gazette, 1840–1854.  William Lawrence served as the editor of this newspaper, 1845–1847.
Logan County Gazette, 1854–1863.  This is the first newspaper published by the Hubbard family.

References

External links 
The Bellefontaine Examiner
Genealogy and Local History in Logan County, Ohio:  Newspapers - Bibliography

Newspapers published in Ohio
Logan County, Ohio
Bellefontaine, Ohio
1949 establishments in Ohio